Shubhodrishti (Bengali: শুভদৃষ্টি) is a 2005 Bengali romance film directed by Prabhat Roy and produced under the banner of  Rajshri Productions & Shree Venkatesh Films. The film features popular Bengali actors Jeet and Koel Mallick in the lead roles. Jeet Gannguli composed the music for the film. It was the 5th consecutive film of Jeet and Koel Mallick together. This film attracted huge positive responses from the audiences around West Bengal. The film was Superhit at box office as it clearly portrayed Bengali culture and traditions and given a lucid image how Bengali weddings take place. The film was immensely popular during its release with chartbuster songs.

Cast 
 Jeet as Arun
 Koel Mallick as Sonali
 Biswajit Chakraborty as Arun's Uncle
 Laboni Sarkar as Arun's Aunt
 Parambrata Chatterjee as Ramen
 Sanjib Dasgupta as Borun, Arun's brother
 Rupa Bhatacharjee as Dipali, Sonali's sister Arun's sister-in-law
 Subhasish Mukherjee as Nitai Pondit
 Mimi Dutta as Rupali aka Rupa, Dipali and Sonali's cousin sister
Dilip Ray as Arun's Father
 Alokananda Roy as Sonali's mother
 Ashok Kumar as Sonali's Father
 Bharati Debi as Sonali's Grand-Mother
 Sanghamitra Bandyopadhyay as Sonali's paternal aunt
Bharat Kaul as Sonali's Brother
Shyamal Dutta as Nagen, Dipali's paternal uncle

Soundtrack 

There is also a Rabindra Sangeet ("Jakhan Parbe Na Mor Payer") in the soundtrack.

References 

2000s Bengali-language films
Bengali-language Indian films
Films directed by Prabhat Roy